Veselinović is a Serbian patronymic surname derived from a masculine given name Veselin. It may refer to:

 Ana Veselinović (born 1988), Montenegrin tennis player
 Borko Veselinović (born 1986), Serbian footballer
 Dalibor Veselinović (born 1987), Serbian footballer
 Mlađa Veselinović (1915–2012), Serbian actor
 Mladen Veselinović (born 1992), Serbian footballer
 Todor Veselinović (born 1930), former Serbian football player and coach

Serbian surnames
Slavic-language surnames
Patronymic surnames